Gemstone irradiation is a process in which a gemstone is artificially irradiated in order to enhance its optical properties. High levels of ionizing radiation can change the atomic structure of the gemstone's crystal lattice, which in turn alters the optical properties within it. As a result, the gemstone's color may be significantly altered or the visibility of its inclusions may be lessened. 

The process, widely practiced in jewelry industry, is done in either a nuclear reactor for neutron bombardment, a particle accelerator for electron bombardment, or a gamma ray facility using the radioactive isotope cobalt-60. The irradiation treatment has enabled the creation of gemstone colors that do not exist or are extremely rare in nature. However, the process, particularly when done in a nuclear reactor, can make gemstones radioactive and its health risks related to the residual radioactivity have led to government regulations in many countries.

Radioactivity and regulations

The term irradiation is a broad one, which covers bombardment by subatomic particles as well as the use of the full range of electromagnetic radiation, including (in order of increasing frequency and decreasing wavelength) infrared radiation, visible light, ultraviolet radiation, X-rays, and gamma rays. Certain natural gemstone colors, such as blue-to-green colors in diamonds or red colors in zircon, are the results of the exposure to natural radiation in the earth, which is usually alpha or beta particle. The limited penetrating ability of these particles result in partial coloring of the gemstone's surface. Only high-energy radiation such as gamma ray or neutron can produce fully saturated body colors, and the sources of these types of radiation are rare in nature, which necessitates the artificial treatment in jewelry industry. The process, particularly when done in a nuclear reactor for neutron bombardment, can make gemstones radioactive. Neutrons penetrate the gemstones easily and may cause visually pleasing uniform coloration, but also penetrate into the atomic nucleus and cause the excited nucleus to decay, thereby inducing radioactivity.

The first documented artificially irradiated gemstone was created by English chemist Sir William Crookes in 1905 by burying a colorless diamond in powdered radium bromide. After having been kept there for 16 months, the diamond became olive green. This method produced a dangerous degree of long-term residual radioactivity and is no longer in use, although radium-treated diamonds are still found in markets and can be detected by particle detectors such as the Geiger counter, the scintillation counter, or the semiconductor detector. Some of these diamonds are so high in radiation emission that they may darken photographic film in minutes (see autoradiograph and nuclear emulsion).

The concerns for possible health risks related to the residual radioactivity of the gemstones led to government regulations in many countries. In the United States, the Nuclear Regulatory Commission (NRC) has set strict limits on the allowable levels of residual radioactivity before an irradiated gemstone can be distributed in the country. All neutron- or electron beam-irradiated gemstones must be tested by an NRC-licensee prior to release for sales; however, if treated in a cobalt-60 gamma ray facility they do not become radioactive and thus are not under NRC authority. In India, the Board of Radiation and Isotope Technology (BRIT), the industrial unit of the Department of Atomic Energy, conducts the process for private sectors. In Thailand, the Office of Atoms for Peace (OAP) did the same, irradiating  of gemstones from 1993 to 2003, until the Thailand Institute of Nuclear Technology was established in 2006 and housed the Gem Irradiation Center to provide the service.

Materials and results

 
The most commonly irradiated gemstone is topaz, which usually becomes blue after the process. Blue topaz is rare in nature and almost always the result of artificial irradiation. According to the American Gem Trade Association, approximately 30 million carats of topaz are irradiated every year globally, 40 percent of which were done in the United States as of 1988. Dark-blue varieties of topaz, including American Super Blue and London Blue, are the results of neutron bombardment, while lighter sky-blue ones are often those of electron bombardment. Swiss Blue, subtly lighter than the US variety, is the result of a combination of the two methods.

Diamonds are mainly irradiated to become blue-green or green, although other colors are possible. When light-to-medium-yellow diamonds are treated with gamma rays they may become green; with a high-energy electron beam, blue. The difference in results may be caused by local heating of the stones, which occurs when the latter method is used.

Colorless beryls, also called goshenite, become pure yellow when irradiated, which are called golden beryl or heliodor. Quartz crystals turn "smoky" or light gray upon irradiation if they contain an aluminum impurity, or amethyst if small amounts of iron are present in them; either of the results can be obtained from natural radiation as well.

Pearls are irradiated to produce gray blue or gray-to-black colors. Methods of using a cobalt-60 gamma ray facility to darken white Akoya pearls were patented in the early-1960s. But the gamma ray treatment does not alter the color of the pearl's nacre, therefore is not effective if the pearl has a thick or non-transparent nacre. Most black pearls available in markets prior to the late-1970s had been either irradiated or dyed.

Uniformity of coloration 
Gemstones that have been subjected to artificial irradiation generally show no visible evidence of the process, although some diamonds irradiated in an electron beam may show color concentrations around the culet or along the keel line.

In topaz, some irradiation sources may produce mixtures of blue and yellow-to-brown colors, so heating is required as an additional procedure to remove the yellowish color.

Color stability 
In some cases, the new colors induced by artificial irradiation may fade rapidly when exposed to light or gentle heat, so some laboratories submit them to a "fade test" to determine color stability. Sometimes colorless or pink beryls become deep blue upon irradiation, which are called Maxixe-type beryl. However, the color easily fades when exposed to heat or light, so it has no practical jewelry application.

Notes 

a.  Generally speaking, an energy of at least 10 MeV is needed to induce radioactivity in a material.

b.

References

Citations

Works cited 

.

.

 

.
.

.

Gemstones
Nuclear technology
Radiation